Hi Bye, Mama! is a 2020 South Korean television series starring Kim Tae-hee, Lee Kyu-hyung, and Go Bo-gyeol. It aired on tvN from February 22 to April 19, 2020.

Synopsis
Cha Yu-ri (Kim Tae-hee) has been a ghost since she died in a tragic accident five years ago. Through a reincarnation project, she is given the possibility to become human again if she succeeds in going back to her place within 49 days. However, her husband, Cho Gang-hwa (Lee Kyu-hyung), is now remarried. She has to choose between her own or her husband's happiness.

Cast

Main
 Kim Tae-hee as Cha Yu-ri
 She becomes a lingering ghost after getting hit by a car while 9 months pregnant. After being taken to the hospital where her husband works, her daughter is able to be saved, however Yu-ri is unable to survive. Four years later, Yu-ri becomes human again after having an emotional outburst towards God for the tragedy that befell her, and is granted 49 days to regain her place as Gang-hwa's wife and her daughter's mother in order to be able to stay permanently. If she is unable to do so, she must willfully go to heaven and reincarnate.
 Lee Kyu-hyung as Cho Gang-hwa
 A well off doctor and former surgeon. After his wife's death, he begins to distance himself from reality, becoming depressed. He develops a trauma of surgery after losing his wife trying to save her.
 Go Bo-gyeol as Oh Min-jung
 Gang-hwa's new wife, who later discovers Gang-hwa's true feelings and about Yu-ri's resurrection. Current mother figure of Yu-Ri's daughter Seo-Woo.

Supporting

Yu-ri's family and entourage
 Seo Woo-jin as Cho Seo-woo, Gang-Hwa and Yu-ri's daughter.
 Park Jung-yeon as teenager Cho Seo-woo (Ep. 16)
 Kim Mi-kyung as Jeon Eun-sook, Yu-ri's mother.
 Park Soo-young as Cha Moo-poong, Yu-ri's father.
 Kim Mi-soo as Cha Yeon-ji, Yu-ri's little sister.
 Shin Dong-mi as Go Hyun-jung, Yu-ri's best friend.
 Yoon Sa-bong as Mi Dong-daek, a shaman.
 Lee Si-woo as Jang Pil-seung, an airline pilot.

People around Gang-hwa
 Oh Eui-shik as Gye Geun-sang, Gang-hwa's best friend.
 Ahn Nae-sang as Professor Jang, Gang-hwa's chief.

Ghosts at the ossuary
 Ban Hyo-jung as Jung Gwi-sun, died 7 years ago.
 Bae Hae-sun as Sung Mi-ja, Man-seok's wife died 55 years ago.
 Choi Dae-sung as Kwon Man-seok, Mi-ja's husband, died 56 years ago.
 Park Eun-hye as Seo Bong-yeon, Pil-seung's mother who died 22 years ago.
 Kim Dae-gon as Jang Dae-choon, Pil-seung's father who died 22 years ago.
 Shin Soo-yeon as Jang Young-shim, Pil-seung's sister who died 22 years ago.
 Lee Jae-woo as Kang Sang-bong, former baseball player who was murdered.
 Shim Wan-joon as Shim Geum-jae, died 6 years ago.
 Bae Yoon-kyung as Park Hye-jin, died 4 years ago.
 Shin Cheol-jin as Mr.Choe

Special appearances
 Lee Ji-ha as Park Hye-jin's mother
 Yoo Yeon as Mi-so's mother
 Lee Joong-ok as apartment ghost (Ep. 1 & 10)
 Lee Jung-eun as shaman (Ep. 4 & 10)
 Lee Dae-yeon as Kim Pan-seok (Ep. 7 & 9)
 Lee Byung-joon as Baek Sam-dong (Ep. 7 & 9)
 Kim Seul-gi as Shin Soon-ae (Ep. 10)
 Yang Kyung-won as an exorcist (Ep. 10–15)

Production
Early working title of the series is Goodbye Mom.

Kim Tae-hee and Bae Hae-seon have worked together in the SBS Drama Yong-pal in 2015.

Original soundtrack

Part 1

Part 2

Part 3

Part 4

Part 5

Viewership

Notes

References

External links
  
 
 
 

TVN (South Korean TV channel) television dramas
2020 South Korean television series debuts
2020 South Korean television series endings
South Korean fantasy television series
Television series by Studio Dragon
Korean-language Netflix exclusive international distribution programming